"Bathe in the River" is a single released by New Zealand supergroup Mt  Preservation Society featuring New Zealand soul singer Hollie Smith. It appears on the soundtrack for the 2006 New Zealand film No. 2.

The single peaked at No. 2 on the New Zealand Singles Chart and spent a total of 37 weeks in the top 40, becoming the country's third-best-selling single of the year. It was certified Gold by the Recording Industry Association of New Zealand in June 2006. The song was nominated for Single of the Year at the 2006 New Zealand Music Awards, and songwriter Don McGlashan won the 2006 APRA Silver Scroll for "Bathe in the River". His own version of the song appears on his 2009 solo album, Marvellous Year.

Mt Raskil Preservation Society
Mt  Preservation Society was a supergroup put together specifically to record "Bathe in the River" for the soundtrack of the New Zealand film No. 2. As well as featured vocalist Hollie Smith, the group also included singer Bella Kalolo, musicians David Long and Sean Donnelly, and Auckland's Jubilation Choir. The group's name is a pun on the Auckland suburb of Mount Roskill, where the film No. 2 was set.

Track listing

Charts

Weekly charts

Year-end charts

Certifications

References

2006 songs
2006 singles
APRA Award winners
New Zealand songs
Songs written by Don McGlashan